Below Deck is an American reality television series that premiered on Bravo on July 1, 2013. The show chronicles the lives of the crew members who work and reside aboard a superyacht during charter season.

The series has a number of spin-offs, including Below Deck Mediterranean, Below Deck Sailing Yacht, Below Deck Down Under, and Below Deck Adventure.

Production 
Producers booked a five-week Caribbean charter in Sint Maarten on the 50-meter (164-foot) yacht Cuor di Leone. The yacht was renamed Honor for the series, and is captained by Lee Rosbach. The original crew used for the vessel were given the time off, to be replaced by the cast of the series for the duration of filming. Rosbach and his first officer and engineer stayed on board the vessel to ensure everything went as planned. Chief stewardess Adrienne Gang, chef Ben Robinson and stewardess Kat Held had worked on yachts prior to the series. The series was shot over a six-week period in September and October 2011.

On August 27, 2013, Bravo announced that the series' first season averaged 1.4 million total viewers per episode, which led the network to renew Below Deck for a second season. The second season premiered on August 12, 2014, and featured four returning cast members from the previous season: Captain Lee Rosbach, Ben Robinson, Kat Held and Eddie Lucas. New cast additions included Kate Chastain, siblings Kelley and Amy Johnson, Jennice Ontiveros, Andrew Sturby, and Logan Reese. The second season had the crew working on Ohana, a 153-foot yacht, during the charter season in the British Virgin Islands. The season concluded on November 4, 2014.

Bravo renewed Below Deck for a third season after the second season finale, which was the highest rated episode of the season. In March 2015, Bravo announced a Below Deck spin-off show entitled Below Deck Mediterranean, which would feature a crew heading to "the world's oldest cruising grounds, the Mediterranean Sea, for its next superyacht charter season."

The third season premiered on August 25, 2015. The show followed crew members living and working in the Bahamas on a 161-foot yacht called Eros. A sneak peek of the season was released on July 21, with a half-hour preview special which aired on August 10, 2015. The season featured Lee Rosbach, Kate Chastain, Amy Johnson and Eddie Lucas who all returned from the previous season, along with another five new crew members.

In April 2016, the network renewed Below Deck for a fourth season which was filmed in the US Virgin Islands.

On February 21, 2017, Bravo announced that production filming for season 5 had begun. On July 17, 2017, it was announced that the fifth season would premiere on September 5, 2017, with Lee Rosbach, Kate Chastain, and Nico Scholly returning. The series was filmed in Saint Martin.

The sixth season premiered on October 2, 2018 and was filmed in Tahiti, French Polynesia. Lee Rosbach and Kate Chastain returned. In season 6 episode 11, Ashton Pienaar had a close brush with death when he got a tow line wrapped around his leg and was dragged into the water between the yacht My Seanna, which was underway, and the vessel's tender.  The show's cameraman Brent Freeburg was able to save Ashton by freeing the tow line. If he had not completely freed the line, the tension between the vessel and the tender would have pulled it tight around Ashton's leg and severed his foot; he would have bled to death in seconds. Capt. Lee instituted strict procedures to keep this from happening again.

In March 2019, Bravo announced a new spin-off, Below Deck Sailing Yacht. The show follows a crew sailing aboard the sailing yacht, Parsifal III, as they cater to charter guests in Greece. On December 18, 2019, it was announced that the spin-off series would premiere on February 3, 2020.

On August 26, 2019, it was announced that the seventh season would premiere on October 7, 2019. Lee Rosbach, Kate Chastain, and Ashton Pienaar returned as crew members. The series was filmed in Phuket, Thailand.

On September 21, 2020, it was announced that the eighth season would premiere on November 2, 2020. Lee Rosbach and Eddie Lucas returned. The series was filmed in Antigua. The season was curtailed after the final two charters were cancelled due to the COVID pandemic.

In May 2021, Peacock ordered a new spin-off, Below Deck Down Under. The series followed the upstairs and downstairs of a super-yacht in Australia. The series premiered on March 17, 2022.

On August 19, 2021, Bravo announced that a ninth season would premiere on October 25, 2021. The season again featured the yacht My Seanna, and was filmed in St. Kitts.

On May 12, 2022, Bravo announced the renewal of Below Deck and Below Deck Mediterranean, and also announced that a new spin-off, titled Below Deck Adventure, would premiere in late 2022.

Episodes

Cast

Season 1: Honor 
Yacht source:
 Lee Rosbach – Captain
 Aleks Taldykin – First Officer
 Ben Robinson – Chef
 Adrienne Gang – Chief Stewardess
 C.J. LeBeau – Second Engineer
 Kat Held – 2nd Stewardess
 Samantha Orme – 3rd Stewardess
 Eddie Lucas – Deckhand
 David Bradberry – Deckhand

Season 2: Ohana 
Yacht source:
 Lee Rosbach – Captain
 Ben Robinson – Chef
 Kate Chastain – Chief Stewardess
 Kat Held – 2nd Stewardess
 Amy Johnson – 3rd Stewardess
 Eddie Lucas – Bosun
 Kelley Johnson – Deckhand
 Andrew Sturby – Deckhand (ep 1–4)
 Logan Reese – Deckhand (ep 8–11)
 Jennice Ontiveros – Deckhand

Season 3: Eros 
Yacht source:
 Lee Rosbach – Captain
 Leon Walker – Chef (ep 1–10)
 Ben Robinson – Chef (ep 10–13)
 Kate Chastain – Chief Stewardess
 Don Abenante – Second Engineer/Deckhand (ep 1–4)
 Amy Johnson – 2nd Stewardess
 Raquel “Rocky” Dakota – 3rd Stewardess
 Eddie Lucas – Bosun
 Connie Arias – Deckhand
 Emile Kotze – Deckhand
 Dane Jackson – Deckhand (ep 5–8) 
 David Bradberry – Deckhand (ep 11–13)

Season 4: Valor 

Yacht source:
 Lee Rosbach – Captain
 Ben Robinson – Chef
 Kate Chastain – Chief Stewardess
 Emily Warburton-Adams – 2nd Stewardess
 Sierra Storm – 3rd Stewardess
 Kelley Johnson – Bosun
 Trevor Walker – Senior Deckhand (ep 1–2), Deckhand (ep 3–4)
 Nico Scholly – Deckhand (ep 1–12), Senior Deckhand (ep 12–14)
 Lauren Burchell – Deckhand
 Kyle Dixon – Deckhand (ep 5–14)

Season 5: Valor   
Yacht source:
 Lee Rosbach – Captain
 Matt Burns – Chef
 Kate Chastain – Chief Stewardess
 Brianna Adekeye – 2nd Stewardess
 Jen Howell – 3rd Stewardess
 EJ Jansen – Bosun (ep 5–11)
 Nico Scholly – Lead Deckhand (ep 1–14), Bosun (ep 14)
 Chris Brown – Deckhand (ep 1–6)
 Bruno Duarte – Deckhand
 Baker Manning – Deckhand
 Kyle Dixon – Deckhand (ep 11–14)

Season 6: My Seanna 

Crew and yacht source:
 Lee Rosbach – Captain
 Adrian Martin – Chef
 Kate Chastain – Chief Stewardess
 Josiah Carter – 2nd Steward
 Caroline Bedol – 3rd Stewardess (ep 1–9)
 Laura Betancourt – 3rd Stewardess (ep 10–16)
 Chandler Brooks – Bosun (ep 1–9)
 Ross Inia – Lead Deckhand (ep 1–8), Bosun (ep 9–16)
 Ashton Pienaar – Deckhand
 Rhylee Gerber – Deckhand
 Tyler Rowland – Deckhand (ep 10–16)

Season 7: Valor 
Crew and yacht source:
 Lee Rosbach – Captain
 Kevin Dobson – Chef
 Kate Chastain – Chief Stewardess
 Simone Mashile – 2nd Stewardess
 Courtney Skippon – 3rd Stewardess  (ep 1–10), 2nd Stewardess (ep 11–18)
 Ashton Pienaar – Bosun
 Brian de Saint Pern – Lead Deckhand
 Tanner Sterback – Deckhand
 Abbi Murphy – Deckhand (ep 1–6)
 Rhylee Gerber – Deckhand (ep 7–18)

Season 8: My Seanna 
Crew source:

 Lee Rosbach – Captain
 Rachel Hargrove – Chef
 Francesca Rubi – Chief Stewardess
 Elizabeth Frankini – Stewardess (ep 1–3), 2nd Stewardess (ep 3–8), 3rd Stewardess (ep 9–15)
 Ashling Lorger – 3rd Stewardess (ep 3–16)
 Isabelle "Izzy" Wouters – Stewardess (ep 1–3), Deckhand (ep 3–13), Lead Deckhand (ep 13–16)
 Eddie Lucas – Bosun (ep 1–16), First Officer (ep 16)
 James Hough – Deckhand
 Shane Coopersmith – Deckhand (ep 1–7)
 Avery Russell – Deckhand (ep 1)
 Robert Phillips – Deckhand (ep 8–16)

Season 9: My Seanna 

Sean Meagher – Captain (ep 1–2)
Lee Rosbach – Captain (ep 2–14)
Eddie Lucas – First Officer
Rachel Hargrove – Chef
Heather Chase – Chief Stewardess
Fraser Olender – 2nd Steward
Jessica Albert – 3rd Stewardess (ep 1–9)
Kaylee Milligan – 3rd Stewardess (ep 12–14)
Jake Foulger – Deckhand (ep 1–3), Lead Deckhand (ep 3–14)
Rayna Lindsey – Deckhand
Wes O'Dell – Deckhand

Season 10: St. David 

 Lee Rosbach — Captain (ep 1–4, 14-)
 Sandra "Sandy" Yawn — Captain (ep 5–14)
 Rachel Hargrove — Chef
 Fraser Olender — Chief Steward
 Alissa Humber — 2nd Stewardess (ep 1-13)
 Hayley De Sola Pinto — 3rd Stewardess
 Camille Lamb — Deck/Stew (ep 1-6), Stew (ep 6-9)
 Ross McHarg — Bosun
 Ben Willoughby — Deckhand (ep 1–4), Lead Deckhand (ep 4–)
 Katie Glaser — Deckhand
 Luis Antonio "Tony" Duarte — Deckhand
 Tyler Walker— Deck/Stew (ep 10-)
 Leigh-Ann Smith — 2nd Stewardess (ep 14-)

Timeline

Reception 

The reality show has received mixed reviews from television critics. David Hinckley from the New York Daily News was rather negative towards the show by saying that Bravo "make[s] waves with reality series set on a luxury yacht, but viewers aren't well served by a show that's anchored in tedium." Reviewing the first episode of the show, he was not impressed because of the lack of storylines and called the premiere "pretty mundane". Emily Yahr, a critic from The Washington Post, questioned the show's truthfulness and added that the series "seem[s] so scripted—the stereotypical spoiled crew members, the neatly wrapped-up “plotlines”—that it's hard to take seriously, even in the dubious cable reality show genre." Rob Owen of the Pittsburgh Post-Gazette was more positive by describing the show as a "fairly entertaining, voyeuristic look at a made-for-reality-TV crew."

David Wiegand, writing for the San Francisco Chronicle, noted the show's idea by saying that Below Deck "takes the idea of disparate types thrown together in a controlled environment and capitalizes on two seemingly inevitable results: friction and sexual tension". Neil Genzlinger from The New York Times criticized the casting choices, writing that "the real issue with this series is that the crew members aren't all that interesting." He also felt that "it's not actually the crew members—the stars of this series—who are unbearable" but the guests, for whom "the word “insufferable” was invented." Sandy Malone, writing for The Huffington Post in September 2014, questioned whether the show is hurting the yachting industry. Malone said, "My conclusion, if this show is going to do positive things for the yachting industry, instead of destroying its reputation for stellar service, a big change had better come with [the upcoming season]."

Ratings

Broadcast 

Below Deck premiered on the Bravo cable network in the United States; the first episode debuted on Monday at 10:00/9:00 ET/PT on July 1, 2013. The preview special of the series aired on June 10, 2013. The first season ran for eleven episodes and concluded on September 9, 2013. The second season of the reality series debuted on August 12, 2014 and ended on November 4, 2014, after airing thirteen episodes. Both seasons featured a "Reunion" episode that reunited all the crew members to discuss the events of the season, as well as a special episode, "The Crew Tells All" with unseen footage of the season. The third season premiered on August 25, 2015 and concluded on December 1, 2015 with a two-part "Reunion" episode. Season 4 premiered on September 6, 2016 and concluded on December 6, 2016. The fifth season premiered on September 5, 2017 and concluded on December 5, 2017 with a "Reunion" episode airing on December 12, 2017. Season 6 premiered on October 2, 2018 and concluded on January 29, 2019 with a "Reunion" episode airing on February 5, 2019.

Both Below Deck and Below Deck Mediterranean appeared on the Canadian E! network for the first five seasons. For these seasons, the Canadian E! network would often air the seasons in the same time slot as in the US, however not all seasons followed the Bravo US schedule.  Starting in season 6, Below Deck and Below Deck Mediterranean were picked up by the Canadian Slice network and all shows aired in the identical time slot as in the US on Bravo. Although Canadians have access to both networks, Bravo US and Bravo Canada (not the same ownership), Below Deck has never aired on Bravo Canada.  The two shows have a faithful viewing audience in Canada – especially since season 5 when Canadians started to appear on the show as part of the crew. Canadians appearing on the show have included Matt Burns from Ottawa, Ontario as the chef in season 5 and Courtney Skippon from British Columbia as the third stewardess in season 7.

References

External links 

 
 

2013 American television series debuts
2010s American reality television series
2020s American reality television series
Bravo (American TV network) original programming
English-language television shows
Below Deck (franchise)
Television series by 51 Minds Entertainment
Television series by Endemol
Television shows filmed in Sint Maarten
Television shows filmed in the British Virgin Islands
Television shows filmed in the Bahamas
Television shows filmed in the United States Virgin Islands
Television shows filmed in the Collectivity of Saint Martin
Television shows filmed in French Polynesia
Television shows filmed in Thailand
Television shows filmed in Antigua and Barbuda
Television shows filmed in Saint Kitts and Nevis
Television shows filmed in Saint Lucia
Yachting